The Cassandra Martyrs of Charity were a group of twelve Catholic and Protestant religious workers who perished in the sinking of the M/V Doña Cassandra off the coast of Surigao on November 21, 1983.

They were involved in charity work to serve communities impoverished and marginalized under the dictatorship of Ferdinand Marcos, and were on their way to a retreat and planning meeting in a Cebu city when their vessel began to capsize after being battered by Typhoon Warling (International name: Orchid). As a group, they were last seen "praying, distributing life vests, helping children put theirs on, instructing other passengers to hasten towards the life rafts and to be ready to abandon ship," but perished when emergency supplies ran out and the boat finally sank.

Some of the group's members were later honored by having their names inscribed on the Wall of Remembrance at the Bantayog ng mga Bayani, which honors the heroes and martyrs whose actions eventually helped bring down the authoritarian regime.

Individuals known as the "Cassandra Martyrs of Charity"
The Cassandra Martyrs of Charity included eight Catholic religious workers, a Protestant pastor, and three lay workers.

Catholic religious

Protestant pastor 
 Pastor Ben Bunio of the United Church of Christ in the Philippines.

Lay workers 
Aside from Fr. Westerndorp, Pastor Bunio, and the sisters, there were three lay workers among the group:

Individuals honored at the Bantayog ng mga Bayani 
Inocencio Ipong of the Rural Missionaries of the Philippines (RMP) and Sisters Remedios Chuidian, Lourdes Conti, Mary Catherine Loreto, and Mary Virginia Gonzaga of the Religious of the Good Shepherd (RGS) were later nominated to be honored Bantayog ng mga Bayani, and their names are now engraved on the Bantayog's Wall of Remembrance.

See also 
 List of maritime disasters in the Philippines

References 

 

Religious workers honored at the Bantayog ng mga Bayani
20th-century Filipino Roman Catholic nuns
History of the Philippines (1965–1986)
1983 deaths